Vingtaine de la Rocque is one of the four vingtaines of Grouville Parish on the Channel Island of Jersey. It includes the uninhabited Minquiers.

Transport
The Jersey Eastern Railway opened a station, at La Rocque, on 7 August 1873.  The station was subsequently closed on 21 June 1929, and the station no longer exists.

Harbour
La Rocque harbour lies within the vingtaine.

Nature

Waders and seabirds make regular use of the exposed shoreline and nearby fields for feeding.

See also
St Peter la Rocque

References

External links

la Rocque
Grouville
Ports and harbours of Jersey